The 1975 Critérium du Dauphiné Libéré was the 27th edition of the cycle race and was held from 2 June to 9 June 1975. The race started in Annecy and finished in Avignon. The race was won by Bernard Thévenet of the Peugeot team.

Teams
Ten teams, containing a total of 100 riders, participated in the race:

Route

General classification

References

1975
1975 in French sport
June 1975 sports events in Europe
1975 Super Prestige Pernod